Claude Carlin (born 17 January 1961) is a French former cyclist. He competed at the 1984 Summer Olympics and the 1988 Summer Olympics.

References

External links
 

1961 births
Living people
French male cyclists
Olympic cyclists of France
Cyclists at the 1984 Summer Olympics
Cyclists at the 1988 Summer Olympics
People from Argentan
Sportspeople from Orne
Cyclists from Normandy
20th-century French people